Saraswathipuram is a residential suburb of Mysore city in Karnataka State, India.

It is located on the western side of Mysore, and is sometimes considered part of downtown Mysore because of its proximity to the city center.

There is a post office at Saraswathipuram.

Academic Community
Saraswathipuram was originally designed as a residential arrangement for teachers and most of the residents were academicians.  But recently people from all works of life have settled there.  The academicians form a majority even now because th University of Mysore and many other major organizations are located in Saraswathipuram.  The area is considered an upmarket place because of its shaded streets and beautiful parks.

Notable landmarks
 Maruthi Temple
 Mysore University
 Karnataka State Open University
 Kukkarahalli Lake
 Sri Jayachamarajendra College of Engineering
 All India Institute of Speech and Hearing
 Happy Man Park

Kukkarahalli lake    
Kukkarahalli Lake is located in Saraswathipuram.  This is a property of the University of Mysore and maintained by the university administration.  The lake was created in 1864 for irrigation purpose. The lake has a three kilometer long perimeter track which is popular among joggers and trekkers.  The biodiversity of the lake area is impressive with many species of birds present in this area.  preserve the lake by implementing several remedial measures.

See also
 Akshaya Bhandar
 Happy Man park
 Kukkarahalli lake
 University of Mysore

Image gallery

References

Suburbs of Mysore